Kick Master (sometimes KickMaster) is an action game developed by KID and published by Taito for the Nintendo Entertainment System in 1992. The game has some role-playing game elements, such as leveling up.

Gameplay 

Kick Master resembles early games in the Castlevania series. Enemies are fought using martial arts kicks and magic spells. Defeated enemies drop three items that will either help or hurt the player character Thonolan. When Thonolan gains a level, his maximum MP is increased and new moves are learned.

Plot 
The castle of Lowrel is attacked and burned by the monsters and magic of the powerful witch Belzed (curiously, Western sources such as Nintendo Power described Belzed as a male). In the attack, the King and the Queen are slain and their only child, Princess Silphee, is kidnapped. The king's guards were all killed, except for the knight Macren. He and his younger brother, Thonolan, an aspiring martial artist, take off on a long journey to free the princess. As the fight against Belzed's minions commences, Macren is mortally wounded by a skeleton. With his dying breath, he pleads his brother to use his "great kicking skills" to avenge him.

There are a total of eight destinations that Thanolan must bravely journey through before confronting and defeating Belzed:

Witches' Forest - A small forest that exists just outside of the Castle Lowel. The skeletal forces that attacked the kingdom came from this area and are led by the witch Druilla serving under Belzed.
Caverns of No Return
Belzed's First Stronghold - A stronghold that was once used by Belzed but is now abandoned. Left in her stead as a guardian is the lightning-wielding gargoyle.
Bottomless Crevasse - Beyond the stronghold is a series of crevasses along a mountainside. A fire-breathing chimerae seeking to end Thonolan's quest awaits him here.
Aboard the Ship of Strife
Across the Swamps
Long Way From Home - What appears to be a dungeon of sorts within Belzed's castle. Not being satisfied with the all of the destruction that she has caused, Belzed even used magic to create evil doppelgangers of both Thanolan and his brother - which lurk about this dungeon.
Sector 8: Belzed's Haunted Tower

If the player manages to complete the game, the evil Belzed is destroyed and Thonolan rescues the princess Silphee. He then torches down Belzed's Tower and disappears, never to be heard from again. The player is then given an opportunity to try to beat the game again on a higher difficulty level. There are a total of three difficulty levels in this game. Once the third difficulty level is complete, the credits will roll.

Level codes

Level 2: F (diamond) ?LGZ-BFKQ (spade) G

Level 3: L3DlS (sapde)-5G?S9F

Level 4: 8MQ (diamond) JQ-RV6G6 (diamond)

Level 5: DJ8 (heart) RQ-P5DKTZ

Level 6: K51PS4-SMD?S6

Level 7: 9TZWMF-X (heart) F3G9

Development and release

Reception 

GamePro gave Kick Master a positive review upon the release.

References

External links 
 Kick Master at GameFAQs
 Kick Master at Giant Bomb
 Kick Master at MobyGames

1992 video games
Action video games
Fantasy video games
KID games
Nintendo Entertainment System games
Nintendo Entertainment System-only games
North America-exclusive video games
Platform games
Single-player video games
Taito games
Video games about witchcraft
Video games developed in Japan